Robert L. Turner (born September 14, 1947), is a former Democratic member of the Wisconsin State Assembly, serving eleven terms from 1991 to 2013. Turner currently serves on the City of Racine Police and Fire Commission. Turner was the first African American elected to Wisconsin’s Assembly not from Milwaukee.

Biography
Turner was born in Columbus, Mississippi and moved with his family to Racine.  He was employed by the J.I. Case Company, and served four years in the United States Air Force Security Police during the Vietnam War, from 1967 through 1970, including service during the 1968 Tet Offensive. He was elected to the City Council in 1976, and was elected to the State Assembly in 1990. He left the City Council in 2004 after serving concurrently as City Councilmember and State Assemblymember for 14 years.

After the arrest and resignation of Racine Mayor Gary Becker in 2009, Turner announced his candidacy for the special election to fill the remainder of Becker's term.  Turner passed the primary, but was defeated in the runoff by John Dickert.  Turner had previously defeated Dickert in the 1990 and 2002 primary elections for Wisconsin Assembly.

He announced his retirement from the Assembly in 2012, after redistricting dramatically reshaped the Racine-area senate and assembly districts.  His retirement cleared the way for Cory Mason to run in the redrawn 66th District, which was composed of the southern part of Turner's old 61st District and the eastern part of Mason's old 62nd District.

In 2018, Cory Mason, now Racine Mayor, nominated Turner to the Racine Police and Fire Commission.

Turner is a life member of the Vietnam Veterans of America, the American Legion, and a 33rd degree Mason.

Electoral history

Wisconsin Assembly (1984)

| colspan="6" style="text-align:center;background-color: #e9e9e9;"| Primary Election

| colspan="6" style="text-align:center;background-color: #e9e9e9;"| General Election

Wisconsin Assembly (1990-2008)

| colspan="6" style="text-align:center;background-color: #e9e9e9;"| Primary Election

| colspan="6" style="text-align:center;background-color: #e9e9e9;"| General Election

| colspan="6" style="text-align:center;background-color: #e9e9e9;"| Primary Election

| colspan="6" style="text-align:center;background-color: #e9e9e9;"| General Election

| colspan="6" style="text-align:center;background-color: #e9e9e9;"| Primary Election

| colspan="6" style="text-align:center;background-color: #e9e9e9;"| General Election

| colspan="6" style="text-align:center;background-color: #e9e9e9;"| Primary Election

| colspan="6" style="text-align:center;background-color: #e9e9e9;"| General Election

| colspan="6" style="text-align:center;background-color: #e9e9e9;"| Primary Election

| colspan="6" style="text-align:center;background-color: #e9e9e9;"| General Election

| colspan="6" style="text-align:center;background-color: #e9e9e9;"| Primary Election

| colspan="6" style="text-align:center;background-color: #e9e9e9;"| General Election

| colspan="6" style="text-align:center;background-color: #e9e9e9;"| Primary Election

| colspan="6" style="text-align:center;background-color: #e9e9e9;"| General Election

| colspan="6" style="text-align:center;background-color: #e9e9e9;"| Primary Election

| colspan="6" style="text-align:center;background-color: #e9e9e9;"| General Election

| colspan="6" style="text-align:center;background-color: #e9e9e9;"| Primary Election

| colspan="6" style="text-align:center;background-color: #e9e9e9;"| General Election

| colspan="6" style="text-align:center;background-color: #e9e9e9;"| Primary Election

| colspan="6" style="text-align:center;background-color: #e9e9e9;"| General Election

Racine Mayor (2009)

| colspan="6" style="text-align:center;background-color: #e9e9e9;"| Primary Election

| colspan="6" style="text-align:center;background-color: #e9e9e9;"| General Election

Wisconsin Assembly (2010)

| colspan="6" style="text-align:center;background-color: #e9e9e9;"| Primary Election

| colspan="6" style="text-align:center;background-color: #e9e9e9;"| General Election

References

External links
Representative Robert L. Turner official government website
 
 Follow the Money - Robert L. Turner
2008 2006 2004 2002 2000 1998 campaign contributions

People from Columbus, Mississippi
Politicians from Racine, Wisconsin
University of Wisconsin–Parkside alumni
Democratic Party members of the Wisconsin State Assembly
1947 births
Living people
21st-century American politicians